Eriocoma pinetorum is a species of grass known by the common names pinewoods needlegrass and pine needlegrass. It is native to most of the western United States from California to Montana to New Mexico, where it grows in woodland and forest in rocky mountainous areas.

Description
Eriocoma pinetorum is a perennial bunchgrass forming tight bunches of erect stems generally between 10 and 50 centimeters tall. The hairlike leaf blades are under a millimeter wide.

References

External links
Jepson Manual Treatment - Achnatherum pinetorum
USDA Plants Profile: Achnatherum pinetorum
Achnatherum pinetorum - Photo gallery

Bunchgrasses of North America
Native grasses of California
Grasses of the United States
Grasses of Mexico
Flora of the Western United States
Flora of the Sierra Nevada (United States)